Tynningö is an island in the central area of Sweden's Stockholm Archipelago. From an administrative perspective, it is located in Vaxholm Municipality and Stockholm County. As of 2015, the island has 380 permanent inhabitants, although this population increases significantly in summer.

Tynningö is linked to the city of Stockholm and the town of Vaxholm by passenger ferries of the Waxholmbolaget, which serve a number of jetties on the island. It is also linked to Norra Lagnö on the island of Värmdö by the  vehicle ferry route, operated by Trafikverket, which gives road access via the  bridge to the mainland. Storstockholms Lokaltrafik provides an internal bus service on the island.

References

External links 

Islands of the Stockholm archipelago
Islands of Vaxholm Municipality